The 2015 Ronde van Gelderland was a one-day women's cycle race held in the Netherlands on 19 April 2015. The race was given a UCI rating of 1.2. Kirsten Wild won for the third year in a row, for her fourth win in the race.

Results

See also
 2015 in women's road cycling

References

Ronde van Gelderland
Ronde van Gelderland
Women's road bicycle races
Ronde van Gelderland
April 2015 sports events in Europe